Thanasis Papageorgiou (born 9 May 1987) is a Greek professional footballer who plays as a right back for Super League 2 club AEL.

External links

 AEL 1964 FC Official

1987 births
Living people
Greek footballers
Greece youth international footballers
Super League Greece players
Football League (Greece) players
Gamma Ethniki players
Super League Greece 2 players
Atromitos F.C. players
Ethnikos Piraeus F.C. players
Rodos F.C. players
Panargiakos F.C. players
Pierikos F.C. players
Athlitiki Enosi Larissa F.C. players
Panthrakikos F.C. players
Xanthi F.C. players
Panionios F.C. players
Kalamata F.C. players
Ionikos F.C. players
Association football fullbacks
Footballers from Larissa